The A7 motorway is a motorway in the Netherlands connecting Zaandam, via the Afsluitdijk, Sneek and Groningen to the German border near Bad Nieuweschans. The entire road is part of the European route E22, with exception of the first kilometer, between the terminus in Zaandam and the interchange Zaandam. The total length is 236 km.

Motorway interruptions 

The motorway A7 is interrupted twice:
Around Sneek, the road is demoted to a highway for several kilometers, and includes some at-grade intersections The at-grade intersections were replaced with grade-separated intersections in 2008–2010. However, it isn't a motorway.
Also, around the city of Groningen, it is demoted over a distance of several kilometers, mainly for the at-grade intersection with motorway A28, and for the road's small alignment through the city in general.
Both of the abovementioned sections are denoted as N7 to distinguish those parts from the motorway, for which the A designation is used in the Netherlands. The A7 together with the N7 is called the Rijksweg 7.

Speed limit experiment 

This was a government test to investigate if driving at these higher speeds have an effect on the environment and safety.

Afsluitdijk 
The A7 runs across a historic part of Dutch engineering, the Afsluitdijk. This dam was originally created to protect the country's long interior coastline from floods by creating a large freshwater lake. The road over the Afsluitdijk was previously a 2-lane N road, but is now a proper motorway; the upgrade to motorway was achieved by utilising the dike's unused railway reservation for the second carriageway. Its midpoint is near the village of Breezanddijk. The former State Secretary for Infrastructure and the Environment, Joop Atsma, issued a statement detailing the factors influencing the decision to build a new naviduct on the Afsluitdijk section of the A7 at Kornwerderzand. A naviduct and new locks was costed at €200–450 million, depending on the size of locks and size of highway. A naviduct would give waiting time annualised benefits €13 million to road traffic, based on the existing bridge opening 7,000 times a year. Cost–benefit analysis of all potential solutions were considered, and a naviduct could be built to replace the locks when they reach the end of their useful life in 2050.

Exit list

References

External links

Motorways in the Netherlands
Motorways in Friesland
Motorways in Groningen (province)
Motorways in North Holland
Transport in Groningen (city)
Transport in Midden-Groningen
Transport in Oldambt (municipality)